Malofeyev is a Russian surname that may refer to:

 Eduard Malofeyev (born 1942), Soviet and Belarusian footballer and coach
 Mikhail Malofeyev (1956–2000), Russian general
 Konstantin Malofeev (born 1974), Russian businessman
 Alexander Malofeyev, (born 2001), Russian pianist

Russian-language surnames